or  is an island in Ibestad Municipality in Troms og Finnmark county, Norway. The island is located entirely within the present-day municipality of Ibestad, although the island itself was a separate municipality (Andørja) from 1926 until 1964. The largest population area on Andørja island is the Å - Ånstad - Laupstad area on the west coast with 205 residents (2001). Andørja Church is located in Engenes on the northwestern tip of the island.

Geography
The Vågsfjorden lies to the north and west of the island and the Astafjorden flows along the southeastern coast. The Bygda strait sits between Andørja and the neighboring island of Rolla to the west and the Mjøsundet strait sits between Andørja and the Norwegian mainland to the east.

The Mjøsund Bridge connects Andørja to the mainland (across the Mjøsundet strait) and the Ibestad Tunnel is an undersea road tunnel that connects Andørja to Rolla.

In mainland Norway, this is the highest mountain situated on an island.

Name
The meaning of the name of the island (Old Norse: Andyrja) is not certain, but one theory is that the first element and comes from the word for "against" and the second element yrja means "gravel" or "rocks", possibly referring to the waves from the sea hitting against the rocky shores.

See also
List of islands of Norway

References

Ibestad
Islands of Troms og Finnmark